Hugh Morton may refer to:

 Hugh Morton (actor)  (1903–84), English actor
 Hugh Morton (footballer)  (born 1902), Scottish footballer of the 1920s and 1930s
 Hugh Morton, Baron Morton of Shuna (Hugh Drennan Baird Morton, 1930–1995), Scottish lawyer and judge.
 Hugh Morton (photographer) (Hugh MacRae Morton, 1921–2006), American photographer and nature conservationist

See also 
 C. M. S. McLellan, dramatist who wrote under the name "Hugh Morton"